Elbe, was a 1,693 ton, three-masted, iron sailing ship with a length of 257 feet, breadth of 38.2 feet and depth of 23.1 feet. She was built by Russel & Company in Glasgow for the Nourse Line, named after the River Elbe the longest river in Germany and launched in July 1887. She was primarily used for the transportation of Indian indentured labourers to the colonies. Details of some of these voyages are as follows:

Elbes third trip to Fiji was historic because it brought the first labourers from Madras to Fiji for the first time. Most South Indians were Tamil speakers but other languages such as Telugu and Malayalam were also represented. Conditions on board were good for the time, with regular nutritious food, plenty of exercise and an on-board hospital, and as a result there was a mortality of less than one percent.

Elbe was the ship that brought the former President of Guyana, Cheddi Jagan's, parents and grandmothers to British Guiana from British India.

Elbe was also used for the transportation of cargo, arriving in London from Sydney, in March 1896 with a cargo of wool. The journey took 75 days.

Elbe was sold in December 1907.

See also 
Indian indenture ships to Fiji

References

External links 
Tall Ships In Fiji's Past
Genealogy.com
The Ships List
Immigrant Ships Transcribers Guild

Indian indenture ships to Fiji
Victorian-era passenger ships of the United Kingdom
Individual sailing vessels
1887 ships
Ships built in Glasgow
1887 establishments in Scotland